Keltner is an unincorporated community in Adair County, Kentucky, United States.  Its elevation is 965 feet (294 m).

References

Unincorporated communities in Adair County, Kentucky
Unincorporated communities in Kentucky